Pajero may refer to:

Vehicles 
 Mitsubishi Pajero, a 1981–2021 Japanese full-size SUV
 Mitsubishi Pajero Evolution, a 1984–2007 Japanese racing SUV and a 1997–1999 performance SUV
 Mitsubishi Pajero Sport, a 1996–present Japanese mid-size SUV
 Mitsubishi Pajero Junior, a 1995–1998 Japanese mini SUV
 Mitsubishi Pajero iO, a 1998–2015 Japanese mini SUV
 Mitsubishi Pajero Mini, a 1994–2012 Japanese kei SUV

Other uses 
 Pajero Group, a 1994 Pakistani action and musical film
  Leopardus pajeros, subspecies of the pampas cat, a small wild cat native to South America and the namesake of the Mitsubishi Pajero